The Auvézère (Occitan dialect: Auvesera) is a 112 km long river in the region Nouvelle-Aquitaine, France. It is a tributary of the river Isle, which is itself a tributary of the Dordogne.

Geography
The river runs in a generally southwestern direction, passing through the Corrèze and Dordogne departments. It flows into the river Isle in Bassillac. Near Cubjac, at the Moulin de Soucis, part of its water is diverged to the Isle.

Communes
The river passes through the following communes:
Haute-Vienne: Saint-Germain-les-Belles
Corrèze: Benayes, Lubersac, Ségur-le-Château
Dordogne: Payzac, Savignac-Lédrier, Saint-Mesmin, Génis, Cherveix-Cubas, Tourtoirac, Cubjac, Le Change, Bassillac

Tributaries
Penchennerie, right 
Boucheuse, right 
Belles-Dames, left 
Dalon, right 
Lourde, right 
Blâme, right

Hydrology
Like most of the rivers that rise in the heights of Limousin, the Auvézère is a water-rich river. Its flow has been observed during the period of 27 years (between 1982 and 2008) at Le Change, just upstream of its confluence with the Isle. The mean annual flow at this station was 8.52 m³/s. The Auvézère is a seasonal river with the highest flows during winter and early spring. The median flows between December and April lie between 12.2 and 16.8 m³/s. In spring the flow rapidly decreases to 4.62 m³/s in June. The lowest flow is observed in August: 1.87 m³/s. The lowest three-day average flow is only 0.22 m³/s. The highest calculated flow is 250 m³/s, and the highest observed flow at Le Change was 182 m³/s on January 7, 1982.

The Auvézère is not as water-rich as other rivers of the basin of the Dordogne, that drain more eastern areas of the Massif Central.  The surface runoff of the Auvézère basin is 310 mm per year, which is close to the French average, but much less than that of the Dordogne (623 mm in Bergerac) and the Vézère (590 mm in Montignac). The specific flow of the Auvézère is 9.8 litre per second per square kilometre basin.

See also
 List of rivers of France

References

Rivers of France
Rivers of Dordogne
Rivers of Nouvelle-Aquitaine
Rivers of Haute-Vienne
Rivers of Corrèze